Buono!2 (read as "Buono! Buono!") is the second album from the J-pop idol group, Buono!. The album was released on February 11, 2009, under the Pony Canyon label, in a regular version and a limited edition version. The regular edition (catalog number PCCA-02840) comes with a Buono! photocard, while the limited edition (PCCA-02839) includes a different photocard and a DVD. Its peak position on the Oricon weekly chart was #7.

The album includes several of Buono!'s previous singles– "Kiss! Kiss! Kiss!", "Gachinko de Ikō!", "Rottara Rottara" and "Co-no-Mi-chi"– while also including the coupling tracks of "Kiss! Kiss! Kiss!" and "Minna Daisuki".

Track listings

CD 
 "Early Bird"
 "Kiss! Kiss! Kiss!"
 
 
 
 
 
 "I Need You"
 
 "You're My Friend"
 "Over the Rainbow"

Limited edition DVD 
 
 
"Kiss! Kiss! Kiss!" (15 second and 30 second advert)
"Gachinko de Ikō!" (15 second and 30 second advert)
"Rottara Rottara" (15 second and 30 second advert)
"Co-no-Mi-chi" (15 second and 30 second advert)

References

External links 
 Buono! discography at the Hello! Project official site 

2009 albums
Buono! albums
Pony Canyon albums